Mark Fried is an American translator of Latin American literature, primarily known for his translations of the Uruguayan writer Eduardo Galeano and the Mexican writer Elmer Mendoza. Fried grew up on the East Coast of the United States and spent his twenties living and travelling in Latin America. He lives in Canada and is married to the writer Elizabeth Hay.

He has translated the following works by Galeano:
 Soccer in Sun and Shadow 
 Mirrors: Stories of Almost Everyone
 Children of the Days: A Calendar of Human History
 Upside Down: A Primer for the Looking-Glass World
 Hunter of Stories
 Voices of Time: A Life in Stories
 Walking Words
 We Say No: Chronicles 1963-1991

He has also translated the following works from Spanish to English:
 Echoes of the Mexican-American War by Luis Gerardo Morales Moreno (editor)
 Past and Present of the Verbs to Read and to Write: Essays on Literacy by Emilia Ferreiro
 Map Drawn by a Spy by Guillermo Cabrera Infante
 Firefly by Severo Sarduy
 Silver Bullets by Élmer Mendoza
 The Acid Test by Élmer Mendoza
 Name of the Dog by Élmer Mendoza

References

American translators
Living people
Year of birth missing (living people)